The 2012–13 Rockford IceHogs season is the franchise's 7th season in the American Hockey League.  The season began on October 5, 2013.

Off-season
Mark Osiecki was hired as the Rockford assistant coach in July, three months after his release as Ohio State Buckeyes men's ice hockey head coach due to an undisclosed difference of opinion with management. The IceHogs' home arena, BMO Harris Bank Center, underwent $2 million in renovations during the off-season, including 400 new lower-level seats, upgraded concessions, locker room renovations, new lighting and other improvements. That work stretched into the regular season, wrapping up in the third week of October.

Rockford saw several player departures during the off-season including forwards David Gilbert, Joakim Nordström, Kyle Beach, Rostislav Olesz, Ben Smith and Martin St. Pierre; defensemen Joseph Lavin and Ryan Stanton; and Carter Hutton, who had the team's starting goaltender for the past two years. Although goaltender Mac Carruth initially remained with Rockford, he was reassigned to ECHL's Toledo Walleye two games into the regular season. Newcomers to the IceHogs included defensemen Viktor Svedberg, Jared Nightingale, Theo Peckham, and Joe Gleason; forwards Maxim Shalunov, Alex Broadhurst, Pat Mullane, Brad Winchester, and Drew LeBlanc; and goaltender Antti Raanta. The team also re-signed winger Wade Brookbank. Several players had skated with the team last year but appeared in less than 10 games, including goaltender Kent Simpson, and forwards Phillip Danault, Byron Froese, Mark McNeill and Garret Ross. Ten of the 23 players on IceHogs regular roster going into the regular season were newcomers. Nine of them were rookies, with seven making their AHL debut, making them the youngest Rockford team in two years. Nine of the players had at least some experience in the National Hockey League.

The IceHogs had a shorter off-season than usual due to their major league affiliate, the Chicago Blackhawks, having an extended 2013 Stanley Cup playoffs and winning the Stanley Cup. Head coach Ted Dent believed Rockford would have to develop new top scorers to replace those who left the team. Nevertheless, much of the focus in off-season practices went toward defense and discipline, particularly on avoiding taking penalties. The IceHogs played a pair of preseason exhibition away games, starting with a 2–1 victory over the Chicago Wolves on September 25. Jared Brown and Matt Lowry both scored for Rockford, but were nevertheless released from the team the next day. The IceHogs lost the preseason finale 2–1 to the Milwaukee Admirals on September 27, which Winchester scoring the team's only goal. The game went to a shootout, where nobody from either team scored until Milwaukee's Mathieu Tousignant in the tenth round.

Regular season

October
Rockford began their regular season with five away games due to the BMO Harris Bank Center renovations. In their first two games, the IceHogs allowed a total of 100 shots on goal. Their season opener, a 3–1 loss to the San Antonio Rampage on October 5, included 56 shots on goal against, a team record for a single game. Simpson, who filled in for Raanta after he was injured at the start of the first season made 49 saves, which was also a team record for one game. Rockford won their next two games, including a 5–2 win over the Lake Erie Monsters on October 11 in which they scored five unanswered goals before allowing their opponent to score. Forward Brandon Pirri was recalled to the Chicago Blackhawks. Rockford had their first season loss on October 12, also against Lake Erie, falling 5–1 after being outshot 20–4 in the first period and failing to score until they were trailing by four goals. After that game, the IceHogs ranked last in the league for shots on goal, allowing an average of 39.5 per game.

The IceHogs won their next two games, both with dramatic comebacks at the end of the third period. They beat Chicago 5–3 on October 18 after scoring two goals in the final 90 seconds, and defeated the Grand Rapids Griffins 5–4 the next day after Danault scored his first professional goal with 72 seconds left in regulation and forced a shootout. Nordström, who had been a surprise pick to join the Chicago Blackhawks in the off-season due to his penalty kill abilities, was returned to Rockford on October 20. The IceHogs lost 5–4 in overtime to the Hamilton Bulldogs on October 22 after surrendering a lead three times. McNeill scored twice for Rockford, and Simpson made 31 saves. Rockford won their next three games, despite their opponent scoring first in each match-up. In their October 23 game against the Toronto Marlies, Rockford gave up a two-goal lead for the third consecutive game, but Jeremy Morin scored the game-winner to secure a 3–2 victory. After a playing seven of their previous eight games away, the IceHogs will play eight of their next 11 matches at home. After two more wins, Rockford was in first place in the Western Conference, and tied with Texas Stars for most goals scored at 34. The IceHogs saw their first home loss on October 31, falling 5–3 to the Charlotte Checkers on October 31. Continuing a pattern of trailing early, Rockford came back from a 3–0 deficit to tie the game but ultimately fell short.

November
The IceHogs also lost their next two match-ups, the last knocked them out of first place. It marked the fifth straight game where they trailed while going into the third period.

Standings

Conference standings

Schedule and results

Player statistics

Skaters
Note: GP = Games played; G = Goals; A = Assists; Pts = Points; +/− = Plus/minus; PIM = Penalty minutes
Updated as of November 4, 2013 

†Denotes player spent time with another team before joining team. Stats reflect time with the team only.
‡Left the team mid-season
*Rookie

Goaltenders
Note: GP = Games played; TOI = Time on ice; W = Wins; L = Losses; GA = Goals against; GAA = Goals against average; SV = Saves; SA = Shots against; SV% = Save percentage; SO = Shutouts; G = Goals; A = Assists; PIM = Penalty minutes
Updated as of November 4, 2013

‡Left the team mid-season
*Rookie

Milestones

References

External links
Rockford IceHogs official site

Rockford
Rockford IceHogs
Rockford